John George Hastings (31 March 1887 – 1972) was an English professional footballer who played from 1908 to 1913 as a full-back in the Football League for Sunderland.

References

1887 births
1972 deaths
People from Thornaby-on-Tees
Footballers from County Durham
English footballers
Association football fullbacks
Darlington St Augustine's F.C. players
Sunderland A.F.C. players
English Football League players